Antwuan Bernard Wyatt (born July 18, 1975) is a former American football wide receiver. He played one season for the Philadelphia Eagles, after a college career at Clemson and Bethune-Cookman.

References

External links
Just Sports Stats

1975 births
Living people
American football running backs
American football wide receivers
Clemson Tigers football players
Bethune–Cookman Wildcats football players
Philadelphia Eagles players
Orlando Predators players
Carolina Cobras players